Erik Jendrišek (born 26 October 1986) is a Slovak professional footballer who plays as a forward, plays for Slovak club MFK Tatran Liptovský Mikuláš. Previously, he played for AS Trenčín.

Club career

Ružomberok
Jendrišek was the best youth player in Slovakia during the 2002–03 season. Playing as a professional with Ružomberok between 2003 and 2006, he scored 30 goals in 56 league games. In 2006, he won the Slovak league and cup double with the club, also being the country's top goalscorer for the 2005–06 season with 21 goals, alongside Róbert Rák.

Hannover 96
In the summer of 2006, Jendrišek was signed by Hannover 96 on a season-long loan deal with the option of a permanent deal at the end of the season. He made his competitive debut for the club on 9 September 2006 in the first round of the 2006–07 DFB-Pokal, coming on as a substitute in their 3–2 away win at Dynamo Dresden. He went on to make his Bundesliga debut on 23 September 2006 in a 1–1 draw at home to Bayer Leverkusen, once again coming on as a substitute. However, he never managed to find his place as a first-team regular with Hannover, finishing the season with only nine Bundesliga appearances on his tally, all of them as a substitute.

1. FC Kaiserslautern
On 30 May 2007, Jendrišek moved to 1. FC Kaiserslautern on a three-year contract. He made his Kaiserslautern debut on 4 August 2007 in their 4–0 away win against SV Wilhelmshaven in the first round of the 2007–08 DFB-Pokal. His league debut for Kaiserslautern came on 13 August 2007 in the club's opening match of the season, a 1–1 draw at home to Borussia Mönchengladbach. He quickly established himself as a regular with the club, scoring five goals in 16 league appearances during the first half of the season. He also recorded three assists during that period of the season.

The second half of the season, however, was not very successful for him as he failed to score any goals in ten league appearances, only recording one assist. Additionally, he was temporary suspended from the club's first team by coach Milan Šašić over lack of discipline. Instead of accepting a fine and return to first-team action, he chose to be relegated to the club's reserve team, where he played four fourth-division games during March and April 2008. He later apologised and accepted the fine. In his last match for the reserves, he scored a hat-trick in the team's 5–2 away win at TuS Mechtersheim. Shortly thereafter, he permanently returned to first-team action.

In Kaiserslautern's opening match of the 2008–09 season, a 3–3 away draw at Mainz, Jendrišek came on as a half-time substitute after the team went 3–0 down in the first half and went on to score two goals in two minutes midway through the second half to level the score. He scored another brace on 17 November 2008 in Kaiserslautern's 6–0 win over Hansa Rostock and went on to finish the 2008–09 season as the club's top goalscorer, scoring 14 goals in 33 league appearances.

In the 2009–10 season, he was again Kaiserslautern's top goalscorer in the league, netting 15 goals in 31 appearances as the club finished top of the 2. Bundesliga to return to the top flight after four years.

Schalke 04
On 29 April 2010, it was announced that Jendrišek will leave Kaiserslautern at the end of the 2009–10 season, moving to Schalke 04 on a three-year contract. Jendrišek spent most of his time with Schalke on the substitutes' bench. In 2010, Schalke brought two new top strikers into the club, Klaas-Jan Huntelaar and Raúl, limiting Jendrišek's opportunity for first-team football.

SC Freiburg
On 19 January 2011, it was therefore announced that he would leave the club for fellow Bundesliga side SC Freiburg in a €900,000 deal. Jendrišek scored his first goal with Freiburg in a 3–0 victory over VfL Wolfsburg on 27 August.

Energie Cottbus
After two years in SC Freiburg, he signed with 2. Bundesliga club Energie Cottbus.

Spartak Trnava
On 18 August 2014, he signed with Spartak Trnava on a year contract.

Cracovia
On 12 January 2015, he signed with Cracovia as a free transfer.

Xanthi
On 26 June 2017, he signed a two-year contract with Greek Super League club Xanthi, on a free transfer again. On 26 August 2017 he scored his first goal with the club in a 2–0 away win against Platanias and on 19 November was scored a brace in the 900th game of his club in Super League sealing a 2–0 home win game against rivals Panionios. On 13 January 2018, Jendrišek scoring a brace in a 3–2 home win game against Platanias. It was his second time that he scored a brace in Super League after the 2–0 home win game against Panionios. On 15 April 2018, Jendrišek scoring a brace in a 3–0 home win game against PAS Giannina. It was his third time that he scored a brace in Super League after the 3–2 home win game against Platanias.
On 23 September 2018, he scored another brace in a 3–0 home win game against OFI, his first for the 2018–19 season, helping his club to acquire his first win for the season. On 21 October 2018, he recorded a goal and an assist in a 2–1 away win against Levadiakos. A week later, he scored sealing a comeback 2–1 home win game against PAS Giannina. On 5 November 2018, he scored in a 1–0 away win against Asteras Tripoli, the club's fourth consecutive, after a low cross from Petar Đuričković. On 21 April 2019, he scored after five months and helped his team take a 2–0 home win against Apollon Smyrni to secure their spot in the top league.

Volos
On 14 June 2019, he agreed to join newly promoted side Volos on a two-year deal. Four days later, the team officially announced his acquisition. On 31 August 2019, he scored his first goal in a 1–0 home win against Aris. On 9 November 2019, he scored in a much-needed 3–2 home win against Panetolikos.

On 11 January 2020, he scored in a 3–1 home loss against his old club, Xanthi. On 1 March 2020, he scored in a 4–1 away loss against Panathinaikos.

In October 2020, Jendrišek had suffered a nerve-affecting cervical spinal injury that had initially threatened his career. The problems arose ahead of a Super League fixture against PAS Lamia and had affected him for most of the month, causing unbearable pain.

International career
Jendrišek has been capped for the Slovakia national under-21 team before making his debut for the country's senior national team on 11 October 2008 in their 2010 FIFA World Cup qualifying match against San Marino. On 11 February 2009, he scored his first senior international goal in a friendly match against Cyprus, netting the second goal in his team's 3–2 defeat.

On 1 April 2009, Jendrišek scored his first competitive international goal at senior level, netting the decisive second goal in Slovakia's 2–1 away victory against the Czech Republic in the 2010 FIFA World Cup qualifiers.

In the 2010 World Cup finals in South Africa, Jendrišek featured in all three of Slovakia's group stage matches.

Career statistics

Club

International
Scores and results list Slovakia's goal tally first, score column indicates score after each Jendrišek goal.

References

External links
 
 
 

1986 births
Living people
People from Trstená
Sportspeople from the Žilina Region
Slovak footballers
Association football forwards
Slovakia international footballers
2010 FIFA World Cup players
MFK Ružomberok players
Hannover 96 players
FC Schalke 04 players
1. FC Kaiserslautern players
SC Freiburg players
FC Energie Cottbus players
FC Spartak Trnava players
MKS Cracovia (football) players
Xanthi F.C. players
Volos N.F.C. players
FC Nitra players
AS Trenčín players
MFK Tatran Liptovský Mikuláš players
Slovak Super Liga players
Bundesliga players
2. Bundesliga players
Ekstraklasa players
Super League Greece players
Slovak expatriate footballers
Expatriate footballers in Germany
Slovak expatriate sportspeople in Germany
Expatriate footballers in Poland
Slovak expatriate sportspeople in Poland
Expatriate footballers in Greece
Slovak expatriate sportspeople in Greece